The Moro I Cabinet was the 19th cabinet of the Italian Republic, headed by Prime Minister Aldo Moro, that held office from 4 December 1963 to 22 July 1964, for a total of 231 days, or 7 months and 18 days. The cabinet is described as an organic centre-left government.

Government parties
The government was composed by the following parties:

Party breakdown
 Christian Democracy (DC): prime minister, 15 ministers, 26 undersecretaries
 Italian Socialist Party (PSI): deputy prime minister, 5 ministers, 10 undersecretaries
 Italian Democratic Socialist Party (PSDI): 3 ministers, 5 undersecretaries
 Italian Republican Party (PRI): 1 minister, 1 undersecretary

Composition

References

Aldo Moro
Italian governments
1963 establishments in Italy
1964 disestablishments in Italy
Cabinets established in 1963
Cabinets disestablished in 1964